The 2009-10 LEN Women's Champions' Cup was the 23rd edition of LEN's premier competition for women's water polo clubs. It was contested by sixteen teams from ten countries, running from 18 December 2009 to 10 April 2010. Defending champion NC Vouliagmeni, which hosted the Final Four, defeated Kinef Kirishi in the final to win its second title. Orizzonte Catania was third and Olympiacos CFP fourth.

Group stage

Quarter-finals

Final four
 Kerkira, Greece

References

LEN Euro League Women seasons
Women, Euro League
2010 in water polo
2011 in water polo
LEN
LEN